Nikolay Dutov (19 December 1938 – 6 January 1992) was a Soviet long-distance runner. He competed in the men's 5000 metres at the 1964 Summer Olympics.

References

1938 births
1992 deaths
Living people
Athletes (track and field) at the 1964 Summer Olympics
Soviet male long-distance runners
Olympic athletes of the Soviet Union
Place of birth missing (living people)